Basmenj District is in Tabriz County, East Azerbaijan province, Iran. It was established in 2021 by separating Meydan Chay Rural District and the city of Basmenj from the Central District.

At the 2006 National Census, its population (as parts of the Central District), was 62,469 in 15,939 households. The following census in 2011 counted 67,389 people in 19,648 households. At the latest census in 2016, the district had 69,369 inhabitants in 21,301 households.

References 

Tabriz County

Districts of East Azerbaijan Province

Populated places in East Azerbaijan Province

Populated places in Tabriz County

fa:بخش باسمنج